Epepeotes vestigialis is a species of beetle in the family Cerambycidae. It was described by Francis Polkinghorne Pascoe in 1866.

Subspecies
 Epepeotes vestigialis diverseglabratus (Pic, 1943)
 Epepeotes vestigialis vestigialis Pascoe, 1866

References

vestigialis
Beetles described in 1866